The 2009 Bulgarian Figure Skating Championships were the National Championships of the 2008–09 figure skating season. Skaters competed in the disciplines of men's singles, ladies' singles, pair skating, and ice dancing on the senior level.

The results were used to choose the teams to the 2009 World Championships and the 2009 European Championships.

Guests competitors from the Czech Republic and Serbia also participated.

Results

Men

Ladies

Pairs

Ice dancing

External links
 results
 

Bulgarian Figure Skating Championships, 2009